Ivory Lee Brown (born August 17, 1969) is a former professional American football running back in the National Football League and World League of American Football. He played for the Phoenix Cardinals of the NFL and the San Antonio Riders of the WLAF.  Brown is the uncle of Detroit Lions running back Adrian Peterson.

College career
Brown was born in Palestine, Texas, and was a highly recruited running back out Palestine High School. He rushed for 1,800 yards as a senior in 1986, and was the rated the #2 recruit in Texas.  Brown originally intended to sign with Texas A&M University out of high school, but due to SAT problems, he attended Tyler Junior College instead. While at junior college, Brown was recruited to the University of Arkansas at Pine Bluff by head coach Archie "Gunslinger" Cooley. Cooley had formerly coached Pro Football Hall of Famer Jerry Rice at Mississippi Valley State University, and had recently come to UAPB, which was an NAIA school at the time. In 1989, Brown's first season with the Golden Lions, he led the NAIA in rushing with 1,465 yards, averaging 8.3 yards per carry.

Professional career

NFL

Brown was drafted by the Phoenix Cardinals in the seventh round (171st pick overall) of the 1991 NFL Draft. He was placed on the team's developmental squad, and did not see any playing time during his rookie season.

WLAF
The San Antonio Riders of the fledgling World League of American Football signed Ivory Lee Brown in 1992 to replace running back Ricky Blake, who had signed with the Dallas Cowboys at the conclusion of the 1991 season. Brown played with the Riders in 1992 and won the league's rushing title with 767 yards. Brown's efforts helped the Riders to a 7–3 record, and he was named first-team All World League, giving him an opportunity to return to the Cardinals for the 1992 NFL regular season.

Return to the NFL
Brown emerged as a potential starter due to running back Johnny Johnson's unexpected pre-season holdout.  Brown played in seven games, starting five, during the 1992 NFL season, but did not make the Cardinals roster in 1993 and later retired.

See also
 UAPB Golden Lions football

References

External links
 NAIA Players in the Pros.

1969 births
Living people
People from Palestine, Texas
African-American players of American football
American football running backs
Tyler Apaches football players
Arkansas–Pine Bluff Golden Lions football players
Phoenix Cardinals players
San Antonio Riders players
21st-century African-American people
20th-century African-American sportspeople